The Nialama (or Nyalama) Classified Forest is found in Guinea. This site is 100 km².

Mammals

Results of a survey in 1998 as part of the follow-up to the Projet de Conservation des Chimpanzes en Guinee indicate four social groups of chimpanzees residing in the park, three of which take permanent residence in their respective blocks. The total population of these four social groups is considered to be 83 individuals (Kormos et al. 2003)

References

Kormos, R., Boesch, C. Bakarr, M. I. and Butynaski, T. M. 2003. West African Chimpanzees. Status Survey and Conservation Action Plan. IUCN/SSC Primate Specialist Group. IUCN, Gland, Switzerland and Cambridge, UK.

Protected areas of Guinea
Forests of Guinea